Sunstroke (Russian: Солнечный удар, translit: Solnechnyy udar) is a 2014 Russian drama film directed by Nikita Mikhalkov, starring Martinsh Kalita and Viktoriya Solovyova. It is set after the collapse of the Russian Empire during the Red Terror in 1920, with flashbacks to 1907, and is loosely based on the story "Sunstroke" and the book Cursed Days by Nobel Prize-winning Russian writer Ivan Bunin. 
The film was selected as the Russian entry for the Best Foreign Language Film at the 88th Academy Awards but it was not nominated.

Plot 
The story is set in a prisoner-of-war camp in November 1920, in the Crimea, after the evacuation of the White Army, with several thousand White officers left behind on the peninsula. The officers are unaware of their impending doom, waiting for their fate to be decided by the Red Army officials. One of theman unnamed poruchik (lieutenant)is haunted by the memories of a dramatic and brief love affair which occurred in 1907. He tries to understand how the Russian Empire fell apart and who is to blame. His musing comes to an end when all the White officers board an old barge, which the Reds sink in the Black Sea, and all officers perish.

Cast 
In order of appearance in main titles:
 Martinsh Kalita as a poruchik (lieutenant)
 Viktoriya Solovyova as a beautiful stranger
 Sergei Karpov as Egoriy (Georgiy Sergeevich as a child)
 Anastasiya Imamova as Tatyana
 Sergey Serov as a priest
 Kseniya Popovich as Olya
 Andrey Popovich as Petya
 Aleksandr Ustyugov as Vladimir Yumatov, an Imperial Navy officer 
 Aleksandr Oblasov as a steward
 Aleksandr Borisov as a sailor
 Maksim Bityukov as Trigorin
 Vitali Kishchenko as a cavalry captain 
 Denis Vasilev as a student
 Aleksandr Adabashyan as a photographer
 Eduard Artemyev as a photographer assistant
 Kristina Kirillova as Lizonka 
 Miloš Biković as baron Nikolay Alexandrovich Gulbe-Levitsky (Koka), a podporuchik (i.e. Second Lieutenant) of the Life Guard Uhlan Regiment of Her Majesty
 Avangard Leontiev as fakir (prestidigitator)
 Kirill Boltaev as Yesaul (i.e. Cossack Captain)
 Aleksandr Michkov as Junker (i.e. Cadet)
 Aleksey Dyakin as Georgiy Sergeevich (Egoriy as an adult)
 Miriam Sekhon as Rosalia Zemlyachka
 Sergey Bachurskiy as Béla Kun
 Vladimir Yumatov as colonel

Production

Music 
The musical score for Sunstroke was composed by Eduard Artemyev, who has collaborated with Mikhalkov on numerous movies (At Home Among Strangers, An Unfinished Piece for a Player Piano, Burnt by the Sun, The Barber of Siberia, etc.).

A leading tune accompanying the lieutenant's romantic feelingstoward his bride and the beautiful strangeris a popular mezzo-soprano aria from Camille Saint-Saëns's opera Samson and Delilah called "Mon cœur s'ouvre à ta voix" ("My heart opens itself to your voice"), sung by Delilah as she attempts to seduce Samson into revealing the secret of his strength.

Also included in the soundtrack is the version of Nikolai Devitte's Russian Gypsy song "Ne Dlya Menya" ("Not for Me"), performed by Mikhalkov himself, backed by the Kuban Cossack Choir. This song had already been used by the director; in his 1979 film Five Evenings it was sung by the Stanislav Lyubshin character.

Release
The world premiere took place on October 3, 2014, in Belgrade, Serbia. The premiere of the film in Russia took place on October 4, 2014; the film was released in wide distribution on October 9, 2014. The television premiere took place on November 4, 2014, on the Russia-1 television channel. In 2015, the same channel premiered the 5-episode version of the film.

See also
 List of submissions to the 88th Academy Awards for Best Foreign Language Film
 List of Russian submissions for the Academy Award for Best Foreign Language Film

References

External links 
 Sunstroke at the Internet Movie Database
 «Солнечный удар»  at the Official site.

2014 films
2010s Russian-language films
Films directed by Nikita Mikhalkov
Films scored by Eduard Artemyev
Russian drama films
Films set in the 1900s
Films set in the 1920s
Films set in 1920
Films set in the Russian Empire
Films shot in Switzerland
Films shot in Russia
Films shot in Ukraine
Films based on Russian novels
Adultery in films
Romantic epic films
Russian Civil War films
Films about Soviet repression
2014 drama films
Films produced by Nikita Mikhalkov
Films with screenplays by Nikita Mikhalkov